Ciro is an Italian and Spanish given name related to the name Cyrus and is of Aryan (Iranic) origin. Notable people with the given name include:

Ciro Alegría (1909–1967), Peruvian journalist, politician and novelist
Ciro Annunchiarico (1775–1817), Italian cult leader
Ciro Chapa (1901-?), Mexican long-distance runner
Ciro Cirillo (1921–2017), Italian politician
Ciro Danucci (born 1983), Italian footballer
Ciro Denza (1844-1915), Italian painter
Ciro Díaz, Cuban composer and guitarist
Ciro Ferrara (born 1967), Italian footballer and football manager
Ciro Galvani (1867–1956), Italian stage and film actor
Ciro Gálvez (born 1961), Peruvian lawyer, songwriter, professor and politician
Ciro Ginestra (born 1978), Italian footballer and football manager
Ciro Gomes (born 1957), Brazilian politician, lawyer and academic
Ciro Guerra (born 1981), Colombian film director and screenwriter
Ciro Henrique Alves Ferreira e Silva (born 1989), Brazilian footballer
Ciro Immobile (born 1990), Italian footballer
Ciro Ippolito (born 1947), Italian film director, screenwriter and producer
Ciro Liguori (born 1969), Italian rower
Ciro Mancuso (born 1949), American cannabis trafficker
Ciro Menotti (1798–1831), Italian patriot
Ciro Nogueira Lima Filho (born 1968), Brazilian lawyer and politician
Ciro Pavisa (1890–1972), Italian painter
Ciro Pessoa (1957–2020), Brazilian singer-songwriter, screenwriter, writer and activist
Ciro Pinsuti (1829–1888), Anglo-Italian composer
Ciro Procuna, Mexican sports announcer 
Ciro de Quadros (1940–2014), Brazilian public health doctor
Ciro Quispe López, Peruvian Roman Catholic bishop
Ciro Rodriguez (born 1946), American politician
Ciro Sena Júnior (born 1982), Brazilian footballer
Ciro Sirignano (born 1985), Italian footballer
Ciro Terranova (1888−1938), American gangster
Ciro Cruz Zepeda (1945–2022), Salvadoran politician

Italian masculine given names